Amy Berg (born May 5) is an American screenwriter and television showrunner.

Biography
Berg grew up in northern California.

Berg has worked in various writer, producer, and showrunner capacities on TV shows including Counterpart, Jack Ryan, The Alienist, Da Vinci's Demons, Person of Interest, Eureka, Leverage,  and The 4400. 
Her other television credits include Boomtown, Threshold and Warrior Nun.

Berg was a featured performer at w00tstock 3.0 during San Diego Comic Con in 2011. In September 2011, she made a guest appearance as herself in an episode of Felicia Day's web series The Guild. In May 2013 she made a guest appearance as herself in an episode of Wil Wheaton's web series TableTop.

On April 15, 2019, Berg joined several other writers in firing their agents as part of the WGA's stand against the ATA and the practice of packaging.

References

External links
 

Television producers from California
American women television producers
American television writers
Living people
American women television writers
People from Castro Valley, California
Place of birth missing (living people)
Year of birth missing (living people)
Writers from the San Francisco Bay Area
Screenwriters from California
21st-century American women writers
21st-century American screenwriters
Showrunners